Jacques Guillaume Lucien Amans (1801–1888) was a French
neoclassical portrait painter working in New Orleans in the 1840s and 1850s.

Amans was born in Maastricht, a French city at the time. His father, Paul Serge Amans, was born in Narbonne  in 1765, was a French officer (Capitaine-Adjudant de place de 1ère classe à Maastricht) of Napoléon. He was trained in the French neoclassical tradition of portraiture, and exhibited at the Paris Salon from 1831 to 1837. News of fellow-artist Jean Joseph Vaudechamp’s good fortune in finding patrons probably led Amans to visit Louisiana, given that the two artists traveled on the same ship from France to New Orleans in about 1837. Following Vaudechamp’s departure from Louisiana in 1839, Amans assumed the role as the most celebrated portraitist in Louisiana. In the mid-1840s he married Azoline Landreaux, the daughter of St. Charles Parish sugar planter Pierre Honoré Landreaux and Joséphine Armant, and purchased Trinity Plantation on Bayou Lafourche. 
In 1856 Louisiana planter Robert Ruffin Barrow Sr. persuaded Amans to remain in Louisiana longer, in order to paint an almost life-sized portrait of his wife, Volumnia Washington Hunley Barrow, sister of Confederate submarine captain Horace Hunley, and their daughter, Volumnia Roberta.
The portrait now hangs in Residence Plantation House on Volumnia Farm in Terrebonne Parish, Louisiana.
The same year, in 1856, Amans and Azoline returned to France, where he died in 1888 at Château de Lévis Saint Nom, aged 87, never having returned to Louisiana.

Work
Clara Mazureau, whose portrait Amans painted when she was a young girl, was the daughter of Aimée Grima and Étienne Mazureau, Attorney General of Louisiana. Amans completed the portraits of several members of the Grima and Mazureau families in the 1840s. As in the Clara Mazureau portrait, Amans- favored the three quarter length pose.

Influenced by the French neoclassical artists Jean Auguste Dominique Ingres and Jacques-Louis David, Amans emphasized meticulous draftsmanship and realism with particular attention to the sitter’s face and hands.

Famous subjects
Among Amans' most famous subjects was President Andrew Jackson, who sat for his portrait in 1840 (the 25th Anniversary of the Battle of New Orleans). The painting is rich in details of both physiognomy and surroundings, and shows an elderly, though not frail, former president.

Gallery

References

1801 births
1888 deaths
French neoclassical painters
Artists from New Orleans
French expatriates in the United States
19th-century French painters
French male painters
19th-century French male artists